Brendan O'Leary is an Irish sportsperson. He plays hurling with his local club Rathnure and was a member of the Wexford senior hurling team from 2008 to 2011.

References

External links
Forde, Gerry. "Wexford Echo: Oulart Stave off Rathnure to Stay on Course for Historic Hat-trick." Wexford Echo | Wexford News | Wexford Sport. 30 Oct. 2008. Web. 18 Oct. 2010. link.
"Goal-hero Higgins Hits Clincher for Rathnure." Enniscorthy Echo | Enniscorthy News | Enniscorthy Sport. 5 Aug. 2010. Web. 18 Oct. 2010. link.
O'Sullivan, Jim. "Irish Examiner - 2002/11/18: DJ Magic Tops for Young Irelands." TCH Archives. 18 Nov. 2002. Web. 18 Oct. 2010. link.
"RTÉ Sport: Wexford 2-13 Dublin 0-19." RTÉ Ireland's National Television and Radio Broadcaster. 14 June 2008. Web. 18 Oct. 2010. link

Living people
Rathnure hurlers
Wexford inter-county hurlers
Year of birth missing (living people)